John and Randolph Foster High School is a secondary school located in unincorporated Fort Bend County, Texas, United States, north of Rosenberg.

The school is part of the Lamar Consolidated Independent School District. It opened in 2001, with the intent of relieving the student population at nearby B.F. Terry High School and Lamar Consolidated High School.

Foster serves: unincorporated areas of Fort Bend County, a small portion of Rosenberg, a portion of Pecan Grove, and the communities of Cumings, Foster, Long Meadow Farms and Lakemont. It previously served Fulshear, Simonton, and Weston Lakes, as well as the rest of LCISD Pecan Grove.

Feeder schools

Junior high school
 Briscoe Junior High School

Middle school
 Wertheimer Middle School

Elementary schools
  Carl Briscoe Bentley Elementary School
  Joe A. Hubenak Elementary School 
  Judge James C. Adolphus Elementary School
  Samuel Miles Frost Elementary School
  McNeill Elementary School
Either of these elementary schools are entirely zoned to Foster High School.

Notable alumni
 Joey Mbu, football player
 Javarris Williams, former NFL running back for the Kansas City Chiefs
 CeeDee Lamb, NFL wide receiver for the Dallas Cowboys

References

External links
 

Lamar Consolidated Independent School District high schools